Misamis Oriental's 1st congressional district is one of the two congressional districts of the Philippines in the province of Misamis Oriental. It has been represented in the House of Representatives since 1987. The district encompasses the eastern half of the province consisting of the city of Gingoog and the municipalities of Balingasag, Balingoan,  Binuangan, Kinoguitan, Lagonglong, Magsaysay, Medina, Salay, Sugbongcogon and Talisayan. It is currently represented in the 18th Congress by Christian Unabia of the Lakas–CMD.

Representation history

Election results

2019

2016

2013

2010

See also
Legislative districts of Misamis Oriental

References

Congressional districts of the Philippines
Politics of Misamis Oriental
1987 establishments in the Philippines
Congressional districts of Northern Mindanao
Constituencies established in 1987